Dirty Dynamite is the seventeenth studio album from Swiss melodic hard rock band Krokus, released through The End Records in North America. It includes a cover of the Beatles song "Help!".

Reception
Since its release, the album has been met with mostly positive reviews from critics. William Clark of Music Enthusiast Magazine described the album as "an album of 12 rampaging rock songs that sounds just as good if not better than anything they released back in the day".

Track listing
All songs by von Rohr, von Arb, Storace, except where indicated

 "Hallelujah Rock n' Roll" (von Rohr, Kohler, Storace) - 3:27
 "Go Baby Go" - 3:38
 "Rattlesnake Rumble" - 3:49
 "Dirty Dynamite" - 3:51
 "Let the Good Times Roll" (von Rohr, Kohler, Storace) - 3:55
 "Help" (Lennon–McCartney) - 4:27
 "Better Than Sex" - 4:17
 "Dög Song" - 3:48
 "Yellow Mary" - 3:32
 "Bailout Blues" (von Rohr, Kohler, Storace) - 3:30
 "Live Ma Life" (von Rohr, Kohler, Storace) - 3:58
 "Hardrocking Man" - 3:10

Personnel
Band members
Marc Storace - lead vocals
Fernando von Arb - piano, lead guitar, rhythm guitar, bass, backing vocals
Mark Kohler - rhythm guitar, bass, engineer
Mandy Meyer - lead guitar
Chris von Rohr - bass, piano, drums, percussion, backing vocals, producer, engineer
Kosta Zafiriou - drums, percussion

Guests
Mark Fox - vocals, engineer
Tommy Heart - vocals

Production
Dennis Ward - engineer, mixing
Helge van Dyk - engineer
Darcy Proper - mastering at Wisseloord Studios

Charts

Weekly charts

Year-end charts

Certifications

References

2013 albums
Krokus (band) albums
The End Records albums